Yupuá (Jupua), or Yupuá-Duriña, is an extinct Eastern Tucanoan language from Colombia.

References

Languages of Colombia
Tucanoan languages
Extinct languages of South America